Otto Peter (born 1931) is a Swiss classical baritone. He studied with the composer Paul Hindemith, the Swiss violinist of Czech origin Petr Rybář, and singers Margherita Perras and Heinz Rehfuss. He became famous as an interpreter of the music of Johann Sebastian Bach and performed frequently with the Zürcher Bach Chor. He was particularly active in Prague during the 1960s and 1970s where he worked frequently with the Prague Symphony Orchestra (PSO) and Ars Rediviva. With the PSO, he made recordings of the Johannes Passion and the St Matthew Passion under conductor Jindřich Rohan. He also recorded several Bach cantatas with Ars Rediviva under the baton of Milan Munclinger.

Recordings
Heinrich Schütz: Saint Luke Passion, SWV 480 – Otto Peter (Baritone), Günther Ess (Tenor), Helen Ess (Soprano), Georg Jelden (Tenor), Hans Georg Fehr (Bass); Singkreis der Engadiner Kantorei Zürich Hannes Reimann (Conductor). Label: Cantate 57622

References

Sources
Croucher, Trevor, Early music discography: from plainsong to the sons of Bach, Volume 1, Oryx Press, 1981. , 
Schweizerische Musikzeitung: Revue musicale suisse, Volume 109, Gesellschaft Schweizerische Musikzeitung, 1969, p. 48

External links
 František Sláma Archive
 Ars Rediviva Discography
 In rehearsal with Otto Peter  (J.S.Bach, Amore traditore, Aria Chi in amore ha nemica la sorte) and František Sláma on Otto Peter. Dedicated to the memory of the Swiss singer and composer
 Milan Munclinger 1923-1986: Documents
  Czech Radio: Otto Peter's recordings

1931 births
Living people
20th-century Swiss male opera singers
Operatic baritones